Lock Yue Chew is an associate professor in the School of Physical & Mathematical Sciences, Nanyang Technological University
. He works in Complex Systems, General Relativity, Quantum Chaos, Statistical and Nonlinear Physics,  and has published several scientific papers. In 2004, he received his PhD in physics from the National University of Singapore. He also holds a Master of Science degree from the University of Southern California. From 1991 to 1992, he worked as a communications engineer in Singapore Airlines. After that, he became the senior member of the technical staff at DSO National Laboratories and later he became and adjunct assistant professor there. Then in 2005, he moved to Nanyang Technological University as an assistant professor. He is collaborating with many international research groups, he had coauthored some of the articles with M.I.T professor Kerson Huang. He has co-authored several articles together with M. A. F. Sanjuán of the Rey Juan Carlos University. He has also co-authored an article in Nature: Scientific Reports on the topic of the short-term forecasting of Taiwanese earthquakes, using a Fusion-Fission processes model.

Public appearance 
Chew gave a TEDx talk in Nanyang Technological University on "The rationality of luck – chaos, randomness and information". He had also appeared in the Nanyang Technological University video on the occasion of the Nanyang Award for Excellence in Teaching.

Awards 
Defense Technology Training Award (1995)
DSO Excellence Award for technology achievement (2001)
Group Performance Award for project achievement (2002)
Nanyang Award 2007 for Excellence in Teaching (2007)
School of Physical & Mathematical Sciences Teaching Excellent Award 2008–2009 (2009)
School of Physical & Mathematical Sciences Teaching Excellent Award 2012–2013 (2013)
Best Faculty Mentor Award (2013)
10-Year Long Service Award, Nanyang Technological University (2013)

References

External links
 His Home page 

Living people
National University of Singapore alumni
21st-century physicists
Chaos theorists
Theoretical physicists
Year of birth missing (living people)